Udrih is a surname. Notable people with the surname include:

Beno Udrih (born 1982), Slovenian basketball player and coach
Samo Udrih (born 1979), Slovenian basketball player and coach, brother of Beno

Slovene-language surnames